Friendsgiving is a Thanksgiving-themed feast meal typically eaten prior to or instead of a family Thanksgiving dinner in the United States. Those gathering are typically a group of close friends, often millennials, although participations has broadened. 

The meal began as an alternative to the traditional family Thanksgiving gathering for people who could not or did not want to go home for the holiday. It has since developed into an additional celebration on a separate day during the Thanksgiving season.

History 
While the concept isn't new, prior to the early 2000s there was no term for it. According the Merriam-Webster, the first use was in 2007 and referred to an informal meal. In 2011 a liqueur advertisement with a Friendsgiving theme appeared and the concept was a plot point on an episode of a popular reality television show. Early Friendsgiving meals were often gatherings of friends as an alternative to a family Thanksgiving for those for whom traveling home for the traditional meal was logistically or emotionally difficult. The evolution of the concept into an additional (rather than alternative) meal came later, according to Merriam-Webster.

By 2013 the Emily Post Institute started receiving etiquette questions about the meal. According to The Atlantic, the term wasn't frequently searched on Google prior to 2012, but by 2013 was being searched regularly and from then, searches on the term increased "exponentially" in following years. The growth in popularity is attributed to several social elements, including the chosen family, the coining of the portmanteau and the evolution of Thanksgiving in the United States from a single-day event into a Thanksgiving season. The Washington Post called it a "curated" holiday.

Description 
The meal itself is often produced potluck-style, with each participant bringing items. Those celebrated on Thanksgiving Day generally replicate a Thanksgiving dinner, while those that are additional gatherings may or may not, depending on the situation. In 2022 Joe and Jill Biden celebrated with a traditional turkey dinner several days before Thanksgiving at a Marine base. Some people use Friendsgiving to test out new Thanksgiving recipes.  

Participants are generally close friends who live in the same area; when produced on Thanksgiving Day the meal is most common in cities with many transplants for whom traveling home for the holiday is logistically or emotionally difficult. The meal is also often celebrated among groups of coworkers as a potluck holiday party.

In popular culture 
In 2020 Nicol Paone wrote and directed the comedy-drama Friendsgiving for Saban Films.

Analysis 
Journalist Malcolm Harris argues that Friendsgiving "is a propaganda weapon used by the ruling class to further their plans for wage stagnation." Reason Magazine called it "cultural flourishing, not cultural decay".

References 

Observances based on the date of Thanksgiving (United States)
Dining events